Uteroglobin, or blastokinin, also known as secretoglobin family 1A member 1 (SCGB1A1), is a protein that in humans is encoded by the SCGB1A1 gene.

SCGB1A1 is the founding member of the secretoglobin family of small, secreted, disulfide-bridged dimeric proteins found only in mammals. This antiparallel disulfide linked homodimeric protein is multifunctional and found in various tissues in various names such as: uteroglobin (UG, UGB), uteroglobin-like antigen (UGL), blastokinin, club-cell secretory protein (CCSP), Clara-cell 16 kD protein (17 in rat/mice), club-cell-specific 10 kD protein (CC10), human protein 1, urine protein 1 (UP-1), polychlorinated biphenyl-binding protein (PCB-BP), human club cell phospholipid-binding protein (hCCPBP), secretoglobin 1A member 1 (SCGB1A1).

This protein is specifically expressed in club cells in the lungs.

Function
The precise physiological role of uteroglobin is not yet known. Putative functions are:
 Immunomodulation
 Progesterone binding: weak in some animals, especially weak in humans. (Note: UGB is itself progesterone induced gene in the endometrium in Lagomorphs)
 Inhibits phospholipase A2 in vitro
 Binds phosphatidylcholine, phosphatidylinositol 
 Binds to fibronectin: The uteroglobulin knockout mice on the inbred C57Bl6 strain develop Goodpasture's syndrome like glomerulopathy due to fibronectin binding of IgA which might potentially be prevented by uteroglobin replacement. However contrary to the animal model claims, human genetic data might suggest that the effect may be indirect
 Uteroglobin knockout mice on the inbred 129 strain appear to have healthy phenotype (no glomerulopathy development), but show physiological differences in their responses to respiratory challenges. The phenotype exhibited by these mice are; decreased bioaccumulation of biphenyls, susceptibility and increased IL-13, and IL-6 following hyperoxic challenge, and changes in the club cell morphology. 
 Target of polychlorinated biphenyl (pcb) binding

References

External links
 Bioinformatic_Harvester

Further reading

__notoc__

Glycoproteins